Octave John Claes (11 August 1916 – 3 February 1956) was an English-born racing driver who competed for Belgium. Before his fame as a racing driver, Claes was also a jazz trumpeter and successful bandleader in Britain.

Early life and jazz career

Claes was born in London to a Scottish mother and Belgian father. He was educated in England at Lord Williams's School. In England, he began playing trumpet in a jazz band that included Max Jones on reeds, and another with Billy Mason on piano. In the 1930s he moved to the Netherlands, where he worked with Valaida Snow and Coleman Hawkins. He also worked with Jack Kluger's band in Belgium. Returning to England, he led his own group, the Claepigeons, making a recording in 1942. In the late 1940s he abandoned his jazz career and settled in Belgium as a professional racing driver.

Racing career
Claes was one of several gentlemen drivers who took part in Grand Prix racing of post-World War II. His first contact with racing was at the 1947 French Grand Prix, where he served as interpreter for British drivers. He made his debut in 1948, in his own Talbot-Lago, raced under the Ecurie Belge banner. Although Claes never scored any points in the World Drivers Championship, he was, like many of his contemporaries, very active in non-Championship Grand Prix races and sports car races. His first win was at the 1950 Grand Prix des Frontières, held at the Chimay race track.

In April 1951 Claes crashed into a crowd while practicing at San Remo Grand Prix in Sanremo, Italy. He was uninjured but an observer was killed and three onlookers were seriously injured. In 1952 he exchanged his outdated Talbot for a Gordini, and later for a Connaught, always with the Ecurie Belge colours, but he also raced occasionally for works teams, including Gordini and Maserati. He also won the 1953 Liège–Rome–Liège Rally and took a class win at the 1954 24 Hours of Le Mans. Claes teamed with Pierre Stasse to finish 12th in the 1954 24 Hours of Le Mans. They drove a Porsche. Together with compatriot Jacques Swaters, Claes finished third in the 1955 24 Hours of Le Mans.

Later in 1955 Claes' health problems worsened, as he had contracted tuberculosis. Claes sold his outfit to Swaters, who merged it with his own Ecurie Francorchamps to form Ecurie Nationale Belge. Claes entered occasional events until the end of the year, but finally succumbed to the disease in Brussels in 1956, aged 39.

Complete Formula One World Championship results
(key)

Non-championship Formula One results
(key)

References

1916 births
1956 deaths
Belgian racing drivers
Belgian Formula One drivers
Ecurie Nationale Belge Formula One drivers
Gordini Formula One drivers
Hersham and Walton Motors Formula One drivers
Maserati Formula One drivers
24 Hours of Le Mans drivers
People educated at Lord Williams's School
British jazz trumpeters
Male trumpeters
British racing drivers
English Formula One drivers
British jazz bandleaders
English people of Belgian descent
English people of Scottish descent
World Sportscar Championship drivers
20th-century deaths from tuberculosis
People from Fulham
Sportspeople from London
20th-century British musicians
Tuberculosis deaths in Belgium
20th-century trumpeters
20th-century British male musicians
British male jazz musicians
Formula One team owners
British emigrants to Belgium
Porsche Motorsports drivers